Charles-Antoine Bridan (31 July 1730 – 28 April 1805) was a French sculptor.

Bridan was born in Ravières, and initially studied under Jean-Joseph Vinache. He attended the Académie royale de peinture et de sculpture where he won the Prix de Rome in 1754 for his work, Massacre of the Innocents. His award enabled him to travel, whereupon he attended the school at the French Academy in Rome. He remained in Italy until 1762 and then returned to the Académie in Paris. He completed a marble sculpture, The Martyrdom of Saint Bartholomew, in 1772. On 30 December 1780, Bridan was appointed professor of sculpture. He trained his son, Pierre-Charles Bridan, who also became a sculptor.

References
 Exhibition catalog Sculptors of The Louvre. French neo-classical sculptures. 1760 - 1830, Paris, Musée du Louvre, May 23 to September 3, 1990.
 Stanislas Lami: Dictionary of sculptors of the French school in the eighteenth century. Volume 1

1730 births
1805 deaths
18th-century French sculptors
French male sculptors
18th-century French male artists